St Michael's College, officially the University of St. Michael's College, is a constituent college of the University of Toronto. It was founded in 1852 by the Congregation of St. Basil and retains its Catholic affiliation through its postgraduate theology faculty. However, it is primarily an undergraduate college for liberal arts and sciences.

St. Michael's is most closely associated with teaching and research in the humanities and in theology. It is also known for being home to Marshall McLuhan throughout his influential career as a philosopher and communication theorist, from 1946 until his death in 1980. Both the Pontifical Institute of Mediaeval Studies and Metropolitan Andrey Sheptytsky Institute of Eastern Christian Studies reside within the college. St. Michael's College School is an affiliated boys school which was once the high school section of the college.

History
St. Michael's College was founded in 1852 as a Basilian college by Fr. Jean-Mathieu Soulerin and other members of the Congregation of St. Basil originally of Annonay, France. The following year, it merged with St. Mary's Lesser Seminary under the unified control of the Basilian Fathers, whose establishment in Canada began with Bishop Armand-François-Marie de Charbonnel. St. Michael's College educated pupils at three levels, operating as a preparatory school, as a liberal arts college, and as a minor seminary. The Basilians received a large estate in 1853 from John Elmsley, son of the Chief Justice of Upper Canada and a prominent philanthropist. St. Michael's College relocated to the new site east of the University of Toronto, and established the college parish, St. Basil's Church. The incorporation of the college was granted Royal Assent in 1855.

In the late 19th century when universities were closed to new Irish immigrants and many Canadians of Irish descent, St Michael's was seen as the only viable option and thus the school became a traditionally Irish filled college. Ever since this time St Michael's has been a bastion for higher education and a beacon for the Irish-Canadian community in Toronto and southern Ontario, with others coming from all over the rest of Canada to attend the dominantly Irish school.

By withdrawing its financial support in 1868, the provincial government encouraged denominational colleges to seek closer relations with secular institutions. St. Michael's affiliated with the University of Toronto in 1883, having secured a guarantee that it would conduct its own teaching in philosophy and history. The university senate authorized St. Michael's to administer its own examinations in philosophy. On December 8, 1910, St. Michael's College became a federated college of the University of Toronto. The college maintained autonomy in faculty hiring and teaching in liberal arts subjects, while the University of Toronto governed examinations and the granting of degrees in all subjects except theology. In 1912, Sir Robert Falconer, president of the University of Toronto, recognized the wish of St. Joseph's College and Loretto College to affiliate with the university. St. Joseph's and Loretto both became colleges of St. Michael's College, thereby allowing their female students to receive University of Toronto degrees.

As the 20th century began, professional education expanded beyond the traditional fields of theology, law and medicine. Graduate training based on the German-inspired American model of specialized course work and the completion of a research thesis was introduced. With the opening of the Institute of Mediaeval Studies in 1929, St Michael's expanded further into graduate teaching and research. Ten years later, Pope Pius XII signed a papal charter creating the Pontifical Institute of Mediaeval Studies.

The preparatory school division of the college was reorganized in 1950 as St. Michael's College School, an independent private school, ending the college's direct governance while maintaining its affiliation. In 1952, the last lectures for women were held at Loretto and St. Joseph's Colleges, which became residential units of the college. Thereafter, all teaching was conducted coeducationally in the classrooms of St. Michael's College.

Throughout much of its history, St. Michael's benefited from a common practice whereby staff and faculty who were members of religious orders would donate their salaries back to the college. This source of income gradually disappeared as new faculty members were hired with mainly secular backgrounds, compelling the college to seek new revenue. The college's first modern fundraising attempt was launched in 1927, but was only partly successful due to the onset of the Great Depression. The Basilian Fathers of St. Michael's College was registered as a charitable organization in 1972. Subsequent campaigns and land sales allowed the college to gradually increase its endowment, expand its academic programs and construct new residence buildings. The Canadian Catholic Bioethics Institute became affiliated with St. Michael's College in 2001. In 2002, the college marked the sesquicentennial of its founding with an anniversary mass held in St. Basil's Church.

Campus and buildings

The oldest buildings of St. Michael's College were constructed on the original Clover Hill estate donated by John Elmsley, and were designed by noted Scottish architect William Hay. With subsequent land acquisitions in 1890, 1920, 1926 and 1928, the college expanded from Clover Hill westward to reach Queen's Park. The present grounds of St. Michael's College form the eastern end of the University of Toronto campus, with Victoria College to the north and Regis College to the south. The main quadrangle of St. Michael's College is in the northwestern section of the college grounds, with its northern side leading into Victoria College.

 The cornerstone was laid at Clover Hill on September 16, 1855, for the college building and the college parish of St. Basil's Church, which was consecrated November 16, 1856 with a Pontifical High Mass. This building is the oldest building at the University of Toronto in continuous academic use. A further addition, designed by William Irving, was constructed between 1872 and 1873 to house an auditorium, classrooms and student residence. In 1996, the original building was completely renovated by Carlos Ott Partnership Architects and renamed Odette Hall, and a modern religious art gallery donated by Fr. Daniel Donovan was installed on the two lower floors.

The master plan and Collegiate Gothic complex of buildings at the western side of the college nearest to Queen's Park were built in 1935 and designed by architect Arthur William Holmes in Gothic revival style: the Pontifical Institute, More House, Fisher House, Brennan Hall (1938) and Teefy Hall (1935–1936)  and extension of the East Wing, (1902–1903). Brennan Hall in the north-central section of campus contains a dining hall, faculty dining room, common rooms, and guestrooms. The small park between Brennan Hall and St. Basil's Church is known as Scollard Park, named for St Michael's alumnus Fr. Robert Scollard.

Fisher House and More House both began as residences for men, while classrooms and faculty offices were located in Teefy Hall to the south. The Queen's Park Building to the north was built for the Pontifical Institute of Mediaeval Studies. A student-faculty centre was built in 1968 as an extension of Brennan Hall.

The Soldier's Memorial Slype connects the college quadrangle with Queen's Park, its sandstone walls etched with the names of St. Michael's College alumni who died in the World Wars and the Korean War.

Examples of early post-war architecture at the college include Carr Hall, designed by Ernest Cormier and built in 1954, housing faculty and administrative offices, classrooms and an auditorium. At the northern edge of campus, Elmsley Hall was built in 1955 as a men's residence and a new residence for the Loretto College was built in 1958. The brutalist concrete building of the John M. Kelly Library was opened in 1969, at the southern portion of the college on St. Joseph Street. The former Ontario Research Council building next to the library has been redesigned with classrooms and offices as the Muzzo Family Alumni Hall.

A private tree-lined street, named Elmsley Place, runs up the center of the college's campus, connecting St Joseph Street to Brennan Hall. This street, laid out around the turn of the 20th century, is flanked by a group of five beautiful brick Victorian mansions that constituted Toronto's first subdivision. On the west side of Elmsley Place, heading south to north, stands McCorkell and Sullivan House (also known as Houses 2 and 96), and Gilson and Maritian House (also known as Houses 6 and 8). Both are student residences. On the east side of Elmsley Place, heading south to north, are Founders House, Phelan House, and Windle House. Founders House, at one point a student residence known as Bellisle House, is currently home to the office of the college's president, as well as other administrative offices. Phalen House serves as the rectory for the Basilian priests who oversee neighboring St. Basil's parish. Windle House, at the northeast corner of the street, is home to the Metropolitan Andrey Sheptytsky Institute of Eastern Christian Studies.

In addition to St. Basil's, the college is home to several other sacred spaces. A small Roman Catholic chapel is located on the first floor of Elmsley Hall and is open to residents. The Ukrainian Catholic Chapel of St. Sophia, which is operated as part of the Sheptytsky Institute, is located on the lower floor of Elmsley Hall and offers daily services in the Byzantine Rite. A chapel dedicated to the Coptic tradition is located on the upper floor of Windle House.

Academics

The University of St. Michael's College comprises the Faculty of Theology, the Division of Continuing Education, and its namesake undergraduate division, St Michael's College. Within the University of Toronto Faculty of Arts and Science, St. Michael's College sponsors the academic programs of book and media studies, Celtic studies, Christianity and Culture, Mediaeval studies and the Concurrent Teacher Religious Education Program. In 1996, the French and German departments of the University of Toronto took up residence on the St Michael's campus, followed in 2000 by the departments of Italian and Slavic studies.

After a reorganization in 1954, degrees in theology have been through the Faculty of Theology of St. Michael's College. In 1969, the Faculty of Theology became one of the founding colleges of the Toronto School of Theology, an ecumenical federation of the theological colleges at the University of Toronto. The undergraduate division of St. Michael's College joined the undergraduate divisions of six other University of Toronto colleges in 1974 to reorganize its academic departments into the University of Toronto Faculty of Arts and Science. In 2005, the Pontifical Institute of Mediaeval Studies ceased to be a division of the University of St. Michael's College and was reconstituted as an affiliated institution of U.S.M.C. instead.

Marshall McLuhan was hired as a member of faculty at St. Michael's College in 1946, and taught English literature at the college until his death in 1980. During this time he became famous and influential for his books The Mechanical Bride (1951), The Gutenberg Galaxy (1962), and Understanding Media (1964), in addition to his oft-quoted aphorisms on communications and media such as "the medium is the message".

The John M. Kelly Library is the main library at St. Michael's College, and is part of the University of Toronto's mass digitization partnership with the Internet Archive. Although the library building was opened in 1969, the library collection dates back to the earliest days of the college. The collection has since been developed in support of undergraduate programmes in the Faculty of Arts and Science, graduate programmes in the Faculty of Theology, and programmes of the college's continuing education division. In addition to more than 300,000 bookform volumes, the library maintains subscriptions to almost 500 journals and magazines and has the largest suite of public computers on the east side of the University of Toronto campus.

The Kelly Library's collection has representation mainly in the areas of humanities and social sciences, particularly in book history, media studies, philosophy, Celtic history, languages and literature, Canadian history, English literature, and Medieval history. The theological collection emphasizes patristics, early and medieval church history, Thomism, the Bible (especially Canon, Johannine literature, and the history of criticism), liturgical renewal, religious education, and Catholic missions. There are also extensive archival special collections including substantial holdings of G. K. Chesterton, John Henry Newman, early printed books, and the papers of Henri Nouwen and Sheila Watson.

College governance

Since St Michael's College's founding in 1852, the school has retained a strong connection to its Roman Catholic roots, in particular, with the Congregation of St. Basil. The college is primarily governed by three offices- the Chancellor, the President, and the Principal. The Chancellor serves as the ceremonial head of the college, and since the days of the college's founding, the office has been occupied by the Roman Catholic Archbishop of Toronto. Prior to 1954, the office of the President was referred to as the Superior, and was always occupied by one of the Basilian priests from the adjacent St Basil's parish. The position morphed into the current Presidential role once St Michael's federated into the University of Toronto and re-organized in the 1950s, although several Basilians still held the office following. Today the President heads the administration of the college, and represents its interests in relation to the rest of the university and beyond. Founded in 1976, the office of the Principal heads the college's academics, and retains relations with all the various faculties and departments associated with and located at the college.

Residences and student life

Within the secular environment of the University of Toronto, the Catholic traditions of St. Michael's are still evident in its college programs, fellows' interests, and student activities. Thus far, the college has largely avoided stirring controversy in its move toward coeducational residences.

Unlike the university's other colleges, where most residences are co-ed, the majority of St Michael's residents reside on single sex floors. However, there are two co-ed residences currently at the college (Historic House 2&96 and Upper Brennan). Female students also have the option to live at the single-sex Loretto College residence; although males are permitted to visit during designated guest hours.

The dons at St. Michael's College are graduate, senior undergraduate and professional faculty students. The college's dining hall, the Canada Room, has recently been expanded and renovated and its hours have been extended.

Within the college, The Dean’s Office is responsible for residence operations, residence programming and all aspects of student life at St. Michael’s College.

The residences for St. Michael's students are Elmsley Hall Residence (Elmsley First, Mallon House, McBrady House, and Soulerin House), The Queen's Park Residence (Fisher House, More House, and Teefy House), the Historic Houses (McCorkell House, Sullivan House, Gilson House, and Maritain House), Sorbara Hall Residence (Lower Level, Murphy First (unofficial name), Second Floor, Fontbonne House, and Wall House), and Upper Brennan Hall.

Elmsley Hall was renovated in the summer of 2020, included painting and flooring in residence rooms, new furniture and updated common rooms on all floors.

Ice hockey at the college
St. Michael's College formerly participated in the senior ice hockey division of the Ontario Hockey Association, and won the J. Ross Robertson Cup in 1909 and 1910.

The Toronto St. Michael's Majors in the Ontario Hockey League descended from the college's ice hockey team.

Notable people

Faculty and staff
 William Allen, lawyer and chairman of the Metro Toronto Council (1962–1969) 
 Richard Alway, administrator and educator
 Dan Bahat, archeologist and professor
 Gregory Baum, theologian, peritus at Vatican II
 Robert Birgeneau, 9th chancellor of the University of California, Berkeley, 14th president of the University of Toronto
 Randy Boyagoda, author and professor
 Father Henry Carr, noted Catholic educator and early administrator of St Michael's College
 Sean Conway, professor and member of the Legislative Assembly of Ontario (1999–2003) 
 , philosopher and professor of Slavic studies
 Leslie Dewart, professor of philosophy
 Maurice De Wulf, professor of philosophy and theology
 Fr. Daniel Donovan, professor of theology and notable art collector
 Ann Dooley, professor of Irish literature and Celtic studies
 Peter Galadza, Ukrainian-Greco Catholic priest, liturgist, and director emeritus of the Metropolitan Andrey Sheptytsky Institute of Eastern Christian Studies
 Étienne Gilson, philosopher and historian
 , professor of philosophy and German
 Mark Kingwell, philosopher and professor at the University of Toronto
 Christina Kramer, professor of Balkan and Slavic languages and literature
 Ellen Leonard, professor of theology
 Robert K. Logan, academic and media ecologist
 Michael Lynch, professor of American literature and activist
 Dave Mann, football player and St Michael's intramurals coach
 Jacques Maritain, philosopher
 Marshall McLuhan, professor of English literature and prominent media critic
 Bruce Meyer, professor and poet
 David Mulroney, diplomat and national foreign policy advisor, Canadian Ambassador to China (2009–2012) . Also an alumnus of St Michael's College
 Denis O'Connor, Archbishop of Toronto (1899–1908)  and college administrator. Also an alumnus of St Michael's College
 Robert O'Driscoll, writer and professor of English
 Margaret O'Gara, theologian and ecumenist
 Thomas Pangle, political theorist
 John Peter Portelli, poet and professor
 Fr. Walter Principe, C.S.B., First Dean of Theology, member of International Theological Commission
 Alexander Reford, historian and Dean of St Michael's College (1987–1995) 
 Yves Roberge, professor of French
 Anna Shternshis, professor of Yiddish and German
 Fr. Jean-Mathieu Soulerin, C.S.B., professor and early administrator of St Michael's College
 David Sylvester, historian and president of St Michael's College
 Emoke Szathmary, 10th president of the University of Manitoba
 Fr. John R. Teefy, C.S.B., president of St Michael's College, journalist, and first editor of The Catholic Register
 Victor Togni, organist and choirmaster for St Michael's College
 Jean Vanier, professor of theology and philosophy, founder of L'Arche
 Sir Bertram Windle, biologist, archeologist, and professor

Alumni

Academia and education
 John Bolt, Dutch Reformed theologian 
 Vernon Bourke, philosopher and professor. Also taught at St. Michael's College
 E.K. Brown, professor and literary critic 
 Andrew Carnie, scholar of Celtic languages and professor at the University of Arizona
 Fr. Joseph Cassidy, S.J., theologian and academic administrator
 Fr. John P. Dourley, priest, philosopher, and professor
 Colleen Hanycz, president of La Salle University 
 Michael W. Higgins, theologian and academic
 Gregory Kealey, historian and academic
 Hugh Kenner, literary scholar and academic
 John S. Kloppenborg, theologian and academic
 Grace Ji-Sun Kim, theologian and academic
 Eugene Carlisle LeBel, notable academic and religious leader
 Richard Longenecker, professor and New Testament scholar
 Fr. Thomas Looney, C.S.C., president of King's College
 Gerard Mannion, theologian
 Douglas Moggach, philosopher and professor at the University of Ottawa
 Kim Richard Nossal, professor and political scholar 
 Rose Patten, businesswoman and 34th Chancellor of the University of Toronto
 A. James Reimer, Mennonite theologian and academic
 Kathryn M. Rudy, Medieval manuscript historian
 Br. Lawrence Spitzig, F.S.C., educator and Director of St. John's Institution, Kuala Lumpur (1954-1960; 1978-1983)
 David Staines, professor and literary critic
 Daniel James Sullivan, professor, author of An Introduction to Philosophy (1957), and recipient of Purple Heart
 Emőke Szathmáry, anthropologist and president of the University of Manitoba
 Lucian Turcescu, professor and theologian
 Paul C. Weiler, Harvard Law School professor
 Peggy R. Williams, president of Ithaca College
 Gale A. Yee, Biblical scholar
 Philip G. Ziegler, theologian and United Church minister

Arts, literature, and media
 Bert Archer, journalist and author
 Philip Burke, illustrator
 Barry Callaghan, author and poet
 Morley Callaghan, novelist
 Eileen Carron, lawyer and journalist
 Anne Carson, noted poet, author, and literary scholar
 Fr. Charles Coughlin, C.S.B., controversial radio commentator and harsh critic of Franklin D. Roosevelt
 Kevin Collins, actor
 Anthony De Sa, novelist and short story writer
 Paul Durcan, poet
 Charles Foran, author and novelist
 Ryan-James Hatanaka, television and film actor
 Hugh Hood, author
 Claire Keegan, short story writer
 Fr. Mark Owen Lee, C.S.B., music scholar and academic
 Bernard MacLaverty, writer and novelist
 Daniel McCarthy, television producer
 Eileen McGann, Celtic musician and songwriter
 Glenn Patterson, writer and professor
 Justin Rutledge, singer and songwriter
 Philip Street, cartoonist and animator
 Katsura Sunshine, Rakugo actor and theatre producer
 Rajiv Surendra, actor and author
 Kevin Sylvester, author, illustrator, and sportscaster 
 Sheila Watson, author and literary scholar
 George Weigel, author and political commentator

Athletics
 Marie-Thérèse Armentero, swimmer at the 1984 and 1988 Olympics, bronze medalist at the 1986 World Aquatics Championships
 Bobby Bauer, Hockey Hall of Famer, Olympian, and long time player for the Boston Bruins
 Fr. David Bauer, C.S.B., Roman Catholic priest and founder of the Canada men's national ice hockey team and inductee into the Hockey Hall of Fame
 Fr. Ronald Cullen, inductee into the Canadian Baseball Hall of Fame (1996)
 Dan D'Alvise, professional hockey player and member of Canadian Olympic hockey team (1980)
 Frank Dunlap, lawyer and professional Canadian football player
 Lori Dupuis, professional hockey player and Olympic gold medalist
 Johnny Metras, inductee into the Canadian Football Hall of Fame
 Mike Pelino, ice hockey coach
 Alan Pyle, member of Canadian Olympic water polo team (1972)
 Bill Regan, professional ice hockey player
 Dorota Urbaniak, rower and Olympic bronze medalist
 Stelio Zupancich, professional hockey player and member of Canadian Olympic hockey team (1980)

Business
 Joseph J. Barnicke, entrepreneur and philanthropist 
 Francis Buckley, businessman
 F. Anthony Comper, President and Chief Executive Officer of the Bank of Montreal
 Victor G. Dodig, President and Chief Executive Officer of the Canadian Imperial Bank of Commerce
 Don Morrison, Chief Operating Officer of BlackBerry

Government and politics
 Stella Ambler, member of Parliament (2011–2015) 
 Bob Callahan,  member of the Legislative Assembly of Ontario (1985–1995)  and Brampton City Council (1969–1985, 1997–2014)
 Edward F. Crawford, member of the New York State Assembly (1957–1973)  and New York Supreme Court (1973–1975) 
 Bonnie Crombie, Mayor of Mississauga (2014–present)
 Consiglio Di Nino, Senator from Ontario (1990–2012) 
 Richard A. Dollinger, member of the New York State Senate (1993–2002)  and judge on the New York Court of Claims
 Leona Dombrowsky, member of the Legislative Assembly of Ontario (1999–2011) 
 James Gervase Foley, civil servant and Clerk of the Crown in Chancery for Canada (1908–1914) 
 James Joseph Foy, lawyer and member of the Legislative Assembly of Ontario (1898–1916) 
 Eugene Pierce Gillespie, member of the United States House of Representatives (1891–1893) 
 Barbara Greene, politician and member of Parliament (1988–1993) 
 James Jerome, member of Parliament (1968–1979)  and Speaker of the House of Commons (1974–1979) 
 David Lametti, member of Parliament (2015–present)  and Minister of Justice and Attorney General of Canada (2019–present) 
 Laurier LaPierre, historian and Senator from Ontario (2001–2004) 
 Mark MacGuigan, academic, politician, and judicial figure
 Paul Martin Sr., diplomat and member of Parliament (1935–1974) 
 Paul Martin, 21st Prime Minister of Canada (2003–2006) 
 Todd McCarthy (politician), Member of Provincial Parliament (2022- present), Parliamentary Assistant to the President of the Treasury Board, and Deputy Government Whip 
 Catherine McKenna, member of Parliament (2015–2021), Minister of Environment and Climate Change (2015–2019), and Minister of Infrastructure and Communities (2019–2021) 
 Marilou McPhedran, Senator from Manitoba (2016–present) 
 Joe Mihevc, Toronto City Councillor (1998–2018) 
 David Mulroney, diplomat and national foreign policy advisor, Canadian Ambassador to China (2009–2012) . Also served as president of St Michael's College
 Thomas Mulvey, diplomat and Under-Secretary of State for Canada (1909–1933) 
 Fabian O'Dea, lawyer and Lieutenant Governor of Newfoundland (1963–1969) 
 John Raymond O'Neill, member of Parliament (1925–1926) 
 Gordon Osbaldeston, civil servant and government administrator 
 Gérard Pelletier, journalist and member of Parliament (1965–1975) 
 Edmond Proulx, lawyer and member of Parliament (1904–1921)  and member of the Legislative Assembly of Ontario (1923–1929) 
 Ian Scott, lawyer and member of the Legislative Assembly of Ontario (1985–1992) 
 Greg Sorbara, member of the Legislative Assembly of Ontario (1985-1995, 2001-2012)
 Elizabeth Joan Smith, politician, Solicitor General of Ontario, and member of the Legislative Assembly of Ontario (1985–1990) 
 Filomena Tassi, member of Parliament (2015–present)  and Cabinet member
 Jim Wilson, politician and member of the Legislative Assembly of Ontario (1990–2022)

Health, science, and medicine
 Nancy Olivieri, medical researcher and haematologist
 Mark Siddall, biologist
 Dr. Andy Smith, president and CEO of Sunnybrook Health Sciences Centre and professor of surgery at the University of Toronto Faculty of Medicine

Law and judicial figures
 John Casey, judge on the New York Court of Appeals
 Gerald Francis Day, justice of the Ontario Court of Justice (1992–1999)  and Ontario Superior Court of Justice (1999–2008) 
 Martha M. Devlin, justice of the Supreme Court of British Columbia 
 Kathleen O'Connor Diesman, judge on the Judicial Council of California
 Guy P. DiTomaso, judge on the Ontario Superior Court of Justice for Simcoe County, Ontario
 John Joseph Dowlin, judge on the Ontario Superior Court of Justice for Kent County, Ontario (appointed 1904)
 John Edward Eberle, justice of the Ontario Court of Justice (1977–1990)  and the Ontario Superior Court of Justice (1990–1994) 
 Harry Edmondstone, judge on the Ontario Court of Justice
 John James Fitzpatrick, justice on the Ontario Superior Court of Justice (1982–1989) 
 Michael Stanton Fitzpatrick, justice on the Ontario Superior Court of Justice 
 Michael Paul Forestall, justice on the Ontario Court of Justice (1990–1999)  and Ontario Superior Court of Justice (1999–2004) 
 Louis Martin Hays, judge on the regional court of Wellington County, Ontario, and a major in the 57th Regiment of the 2nd/10th Dragoons (1907)
 Bernard William Hurley, justice of the Ontario Court of Justice (1990–1999)  and Ontario Superior Court of Justice (1999–2002) 
 Joseph James, judge on the Ontario Superior Court of Justice
 William Deneau Lyon, judge on the Ontario Superior Court of Justice (1990–1998) 
 Frank Marrocco, Associate Chief Justice of the Ontario Superior Court of Justice (2005–2020) 
 Patrick McCurry, judge on the regional court of the Parry Sound District of Ontario (appointed 1898)
 Murray Alexander Mogan, judge on the Tax Court of Canada (appointed 1988)
 J. Patrick Moore, judge on the Ontario Superior Court of Justice (2005–2020) 
 Michael Andrew McHugh, judge on the regional court of Essex County, Ontario (appointed 1891)
 Nicholson Duncan McRae, justice of the High Court of Justice (1982–1990), Ontario Court of Justice (1990–1999), and Ontario Superior Court of Justice (1999–2005) 
 Hugh Michael O'Connell, justice of the Ontario Court of Justice (1990–1999)  and Ontario Superior Court of Justice (1999–2008) 
 John Gerald Joseph O'Driscoll, justice of the High Court of Justice (1971–1990), Ontario Court of Justice (1990–1999), and Ontario Superior Court of Justice (1999–2006) 
 Dennis O'Leary, justice of the Ontario Superior Court of Justice (1971–2001) 
 George Bourke Smith, justice of the Ontario Court of Justice (1990–1999)  and Ontario Superior Court of Justice (1999–2008) 
 Edward Wren, justice of the Ontario Superior Court of Justice

Religious figures
 Francis Valentine Allen, titular Bishop of Avensa (1954–1977)  and auxiliary Bishop of Toronto (1954–1977) 
 Bryan Bayda, Bishop of the Ukrainian Catholic Eparchy of Saskatoon (2008–present)
 John Anthony Boissonneau, titular Bishop of Tambeae (2001–present)  and auxiliary Bishop of Toronto (2001–present) 
 Fr. Michael Brehl, C.S.s.R., Superior General of the Redemptorist Order (2009–present) 
 Thomas Burke, Bishop of Albany (1894–1915) 
 Francis Patrick Carroll, Bishop of Calgary (1935–1966) 
 Frederick Joseph Colli, Bishop of Thunder Bay (1999–present) 
 Joseph Henry Conroy, Bishop of Ogdensburg (1921–1939) 
 David Frederick Cunningham, Bishop of Syracuse (1970–1976) 
 Celestine Damiano, Apostolic Nuncio to South Africa (1952–1960)  and Bishop of Camden (1960–1967) 
 Roman Danylak, Bishop and Apostolic Administrator of the Ukrainian Catholic Eparchy of Toronto (1992–2012) 
 Nicola De Angelis,  titular Bishop of Remesiana (1992), auxiliary Bishop of Toronto (1992–2002), and Bishop of Peterborough (2002–2014) 
 Fr. Wilfrid Dewan, C.S.P., Superior of the Paulist Fathers (1978–1986) 
 Thomas Joseph Dowling, Bishop of Peterborough (1886–1889)  and Bishop of Hamilton (1889–1924) 
 Ralph H. Dignan, Bishop of Sault Sainte Marie (1934-1958)
 Ronald Peter Fabbro, Bishop of London (2002–present) 
 Jacques Fabre-Jeune, Bishop of Charleston (2022–present)
 George Flahiff, Roman Catholic Cardinal and Archbishop of Winnipeg (1961–1982) 
 Richard Grecco, Bishop of Charlottetown (2009–2021) 
 Jon Hansen, Bishop of Mackenzie-Fort Smith (2017–present) 
 Fr. William Richard Harris, Roman Catholic priest, Church historian, Dean of the Roman Catholic Diocese of Saint Catharines
 James Joseph Hartley, Bishop of Columbus (1904-1944)
 Robert Kasun, auxiliary Bishop of Toronto (2016–present) 
 Brian Kolodiejchuk, Roman Catholic priest and advocate for the canonization of St Mother Teresa
 Michael Pearse Lacey, auxiliary Bishop of Toronto (1979–1993) 
 Fergus McEvay, Archbishop of Toronto (1908–1911) 
 Fr. Tom McKillop, Roman Catholic priest and member of the Order of Canada
 J. Michael Miller, Archbishop of Vancouver (2009–present)
 Fr. Thomas Mooney, Catholic chaplain killed during World War II
 Kenneth Nowakowski, Bishop of the Ukrainian Catholic Eparchy of the Holy Family of London (2020–present)
 Denis O'Connor, first Canadian-born Archbishop of Toronto (1899–1908) . Also taught at the University of St Michael's College
 Richard Alphonsus O'Connor, Bishop of Peterborough (1889-1913)
 John Aloysius O'Mara, Bishop of Thunder Bay (1976-1991), Bishop of St. Catharines (1991-2002)
 Ricardo Ramírez, Bishop of Las Cruces (1982–2013) 
 David Joseph Scollard, Bishop of Sault Sainte Marie (1904–1934) 
 John Michael Sherlock, Bishop of London (1978–2002) 
 Francis John Spence, Archbishop of Kingston (1982–2002) 
 Michael Joseph Spratt, Archbishop of Kingston (1911–1938) 
 Anthony F. Tonnos, Bishop of Hamilton (1983–2010) 
 Benjamin Ibberson Webster, auxiliary Bishop of Toronto (1946–1954), Bishop of Peterborough (1954–1968) 
 James Matthew Wingle, Bishop of Yarmouth (1993–2001), Bishop of St. Catharines (2001–2010)

Further reading
 Friedland, Martin L. The University of Toronto: A History. University of Toronto Press, 2002.
McCorkell, Edmund J. Memoirs of Rev. E.J. McCorkell, C.S.B. Basilian Press, 1975.
 Shook, Laurence K. Catholic Post-Secondary Education in English-Speaking Canada: A History. University of Toronto Press, 1971
 Slater, John G. Minerva's Aviary: Philosophy at Toronto. University of Toronto Press, 2005.

References

External links

Official website
Association of Universities and Colleges of Canada profile
Association of Theological Schools in the United States and Canada member school profile
Toronto's Historical Plaques – St. Michael's College

St. Michael's College
Catholic universities and colleges in Canada
Educational institutions established in 1852
Catholic Church in Ontario
1852 establishments in Canada